Deconica aequatoriae is a species of mushroom in the family Strophariaceae found in Ecuador.

References

Strophariaceae
Fungi described in 1978
Fungi of Ecuador
Taxa named by Rolf Singer